The 2016–17 FC Porto season was the club's 107th competitive season and the 83rd consecutive season in the top flight of Portuguese football. It began on 12 August 2016 and concluded on 21 May 2017. For the third consecutive season, Porto failed to win any of the official competitions in which it was involved. The last time the team had at least three successive seasons without winning a trophy was before 1976–77.

As in the previous two seasons, Porto did not begin their campaign by playing the Supertaça Cândido de Oliveira, as they failed to qualify for the 2016 edition by not winning either the 2015–16 Primeira Liga title (retained by Benfica) or the 2015–16 Taça de Portugal (final lost to Braga). Their 2016–17 Primeira Liga debut match was a 3–1 away win against Rio Ave, with Mexican winger Jesús Corona scoring the team's first league goal. Porto finished the league in second place with 76 points, 6 points behind four-time champions Benfica, thus failing to win the title for the fourth successive season, which had not happened since the 1982–83 season.

Besides competing for the Primeira Liga title, Porto participated in other domestic competitions. In the 2016–17 Taça de Portugal, they were eliminated in the fourth round by Chaves, losing 3–2 after a penalty shootout. The team also participated in the 2016–17 Taça da Liga, but were eliminated in the starting round for the second consecutive season after finishing last in their third-round group.

In UEFA competitions, Porto secured their sixth consecutive and 21st overall participation in the UEFA Champions League group stage – a record shared with Barcelona and Real Madrid – after overcoming the play-off round. They reached the round of 16, where they were eliminated by eventual losing finalists Juventus.

Players

Squad information

Transfers

In

Loan in

Loan return

Out

Loan out

Technical staff

{| class=wikitable
|-
!Position
!Name
|-
| Head coach ||  Nuno Espírito Santo
|-
| Assistant coach(es) ||  Rui Barros Rui Pedro Silva
|-
| Goalkeeping coach ||  Rui Barbosa
|-
| Fitness coach ||  António Dias
|-

Pre-season and friendlies
Porto announced their pre-season fixture list on 22 June 2016.

Competitions

Overall record

Primeira Liga

League table

Results by round

Matches

Taça de Portugal

Third round

Fourth round

Taça da Liga

Third round

UEFA Champions League

Play-off round

Group stage

Round of 16

Statistics

Appearances and discipline

Goalscorers

References

FC Porto seasons
Porto
Porto